This list of DNA nanotechnology research groups gives a partial overview of academic research organisations in the field of DNA nanotechnology, sorted geographically. Any sufficiently notable research group (which in general can be considered as any group having published in well regarded, high impact factor journals) should be listed here, along with a brief description of their research.

North America

Asia

Europe

References 

DNA nanotechnology
Research groups